Ogyris abrota, the dark purple azure, is a butterfly in the family Lycaenidae. It is found in Australia, from southern Queensland to south-eastern Australia.

The wingspan is about 40 mm. The upper surface of the wings of the males is purple with black margins. Females are brown with a large cream patch on the forewings.

The larvae feed on Amyema congener, Dendrophthoe vitellina, Muellerina celastroides and Muellerina eucalyptoides. The larvae are pinkish brown with dark markings. They are attended by ants from the Crematogaster, Rhytidoponera and Technomyrmex genera, as well as Linepithema humile.

References

Butterflies described in 1851
Arhopalini